Soul On Fire is a 2005 album by soca artist KMC after he was signed to the American record label Sequence Records. The album entered the Billboard 200 chart at number 84 and has sold roughly 285,000 copies worldwide.

Track listing 

"Soul On Fire"
"First Experience" - (with Wayne Marshall)
"Love"
"Arms of My Baby"
"Darlin Darlin" - (with Kimberly)
"Put It Up"
"Gyal Dem Wine" - (with Ward 1)
"Wanted In Jamaica"
"Call Me Now"
"Rollin Back" - (with Jungle)
"How We Do It"
"Mr. Adam's Daughter"
"Lover for Life"
"Mr. DJ" - (with Shivorne)
"Ready Again"
"Soul On Fire" - (mega mix, bonus track, with Beenie Man/Fatman Scoop/D-Life)

2005 albums
KMC (musician) albums